The Lancashire and Yorkshire Railway Class 28 was a class of 0-6-0 steam locomotive, designed by George Hughes for the Lancashire and Yorkshire Railway (L&YR). It was a rebuild of Aspinall's Class 27, with the addition of a Belpaire firebox and the extension of the footplate and front sandboxes. It was similar, but had larger cylinders and a  superheater. It had  wheels.

Ownership changes
The locomotives passed briefly to the London and North Western Railway (LNWR) in 1922 and then to the London, Midland and Scottish Railway (LMS) in 1923. The LMS gave them the power classification 3F. Their LMS numbers were 12515-12619. 
In 1948, the surviving locomotives (35) passed to British Railways (BR), which numbered them 52528-52619 (with gaps).

In fiction

The Class 28 was the inspiration for the character James the Red Engine from The Railway Series books by the Rev W Awdry, and the spin-off TV series Thomas and Friends. Awdry describes James as an experimental rebuild as a 2-6-0 with 5 ft 6 in driving wheels. The other obvious visual difference from the Class 28 is the lack of the sandboxes over the front splashers. James also has a Fowler tender.

References

External links

 Class LYR28 Details at Rail UK

28
0-6-0 locomotives
Railway locomotives introduced in 1912
Standard gauge steam locomotives of Great Britain
Scrapped locomotives